Alan E. Eyre is the  first-ever Persian language spokesperson of the United States Department of State. Eyre became the State Department's Persian-language spokesperson in April 2011. The post was created as part of U.S. government efforts to communicate with the Iranian peoples.

Early life and education
He studied American literature at Dartmouth College and became interested in Sufi poetry, so he taught himself Persian. He lived for a few years in Los Angeles and made friends in the city's large Iranian expatriate community.

Career 
Eyre was the head of Iran office at the U.S. Consulate in Dubai, and is a fluent Persian speaker with Iranian proverbs and expressions. Eyre has been interviewed in Persian by some Persian-language media.

Eyre was involved in the nuclear talks with Iran and participated in written framework agreement negotiation.

References

Living people
1959 births
21st-century American writers
Dartmouth College alumni